is a Japanese footballer who plays for Ehime FC.

Career
Born in Hyōgo Prefecture, Yokotani was brought up in the Koto area of Nishinomiya where he attended the Koryo junior high school.

Yokotani was a product of Gamba Osaka youth academy and has been capped for the Japan at Under 17, 19 and Under 21 level. He was a member of the Japan squad playing at the AFC Youth Championship in 2006.

Yokotani was promoted to Gamba's first team in 2008. He made his first team debut on 7 July 2007, in a League Cup tie away at Urawa Red Diamonds. In January 2008, he joined 2nd Division side Ehime on loan. He scored his first goal for Ehime in a 4-1 defeat at Sanfrecce Hiroshima, on 23 September 2008.

On 7 January 2013, Yokotani moved to Kyoto Sanga on a season-long loan. He then signed for Kyoto-based club, before moving to Omiya Ardija.

Club statistics
Updated to 23 February 2018.

References

External links
 Profile at Omiya Ardija

 

1987 births
Living people
Association football people from Hyōgo Prefecture
Japanese footballers
J1 League players
J2 League players
Gamba Osaka players
Ehime FC players
Kyoto Sanga FC players
Omiya Ardija players
Ventforet Kofu players
Association football midfielders